Mauro Martini (born 17 May 1964) is a former Italian race car driver.

Highlights of his career included placing runner-up in both Italian Formula Three Championship and the Formula 3 European Cup, both in 1988. He was third in the 1990 Japanese Formula 3000 Championship, later won the championship in 1992 and was second with Toyota at the 1994 24 Hours of Le Mans. His last year of racing was in 1997.

References

External links
 Information at driverdb.com

1964 births
Living people
Italian racing drivers
Japanese Formula 3000 Championship drivers
Formula Nippon drivers
Italian Formula Three Championship drivers
FIA GT Championship drivers
24 Hours of Le Mans drivers
International Formula 3000 drivers
World Sportscar Championship drivers
Italian expatriates in Japan

Jaguar Racing drivers